The Basmane-Alaşehir Regional, numbered B36, is a  long regional passenger train operated by the Turkish State Railways, running from Basmane Terminal in İzmir to the town of Alaşehir. The train operates daily in each direction. Scheduled journey time is 3 hours and 2 minutes. In current operation practice, two trainsets each roundtrip between Alaşehir and Basmane and back, followed by one roundtrip between Alaşehir and Manisa and back, in a day.

References

Turkish State Railways